Zuleyka Silver (born August 2, 1991) is a Mexican-American actress, fashion model, and the seventh runner-up of the seventh season of Univision's Nuestra Belleza Latina.

Early life
Silver was born in Tijuana, Baja California, Mexico.

Career
Commencing her acting career by debuting in the television film The Strip (2010), Silver has frequently appeared in episodes of popular television series such as 90210, Big Time Rush, Touch, CSI: Crime Scene Investigation, and The Bold and the Beautiful.

In 2009, she auditioned for Model Latina'''s third season, where she finished as the second runner-up. In 2013, she auditioned for Nuestra Belleza Latina 2013, representing her home country Mexico, where she portrayed acclaimed Mexican actress María Félix in a photo shoot, and had the opportunity to portray María José Tenorio, a character from Jenni Rivera's acting debut film Filly Brown.

She portrayed Anna in the Canadian horror thriller film Girl House, in which she co-starred with Ali Cobrin, Slaine, Nicole Arianna Fox, Wesley MacInnes and Camren Bicondova. She also played the role of Daniela Welker in the TV series The Mentalist.

In 2016, she appeared in one episode of the American TV series Code Black playing the role of Kamilla. In 2016, she appeared in one episode of the American TV series Hawaii Five-0 playing the role of Isabel. In 2017, she appeared in the episode "Potato Salad, a Broomstick, and Dad’s Whiskey" of the American TV series Young Sheldon playing the role of Selena.

In August 2022, it was announced that Silver has joined the cast of CBS’ The Young and the Restless'' as a high-powered executive named Audra Charles who’s lured to town by one of Genoa City’s business icons. She first appeared on the soap in September 22, 2022, in a recurring role.

Filmography

Film

Television

References

External links

1991 births
Living people
Mexican film actresses
Mexican television actresses
American film actresses
American television actresses
Naturalized citizens of the United States
Mexican female models
American female models
Actresses from Baja California
Mexican emigrants to the United States
People from Tijuana
21st-century Mexican women